The M47 Dragon, known as the FGM-77 during development, is an American shoulder-fired, man-portable anti-tank guided missile system. It was phased out of U.S. military service in 2001, in favor of the newer FGM-148 Javelin system.

The M47 Dragon uses a wire-guidance system in concert with a high explosive anti-tank warhead and was capable of defeating armored vehicles, fortified bunkers, main battle tanks, and other hardened targets. While it was primarily created to defeat the Soviet Union's T-55, T-62, and T-72 tanks, it saw use well into the 1990s, seeing action in the Persian Gulf War. The U.S. military officially retired the weapon in 2001. The United States destroyed the last of its stocks of the missile in 2009. The weapon system remains in active service with other militaries around the world.

History

In 1959, the US Army Ordnance Missile Command suggested the development of a heavy medium range assault weapon.

In 1960, the United States Army launched the MAW (Medium Anti-tank Weapon) program on a proposal from Douglas. In 1966, Douglas was awarded the contract to develop the XM47. In 1967, the XM47 was redesignated FGM-77 and FTM-77 (the FTM-77 being the training version). The first missile test took place in December 1967 followed by the first shot in real conditions (firing set, guidance and launcher) on 5 July 1968.

Used by the U.S. Army, the U.S. Marine Corps, as well as many foreign militaries, the M47 Dragon was first fielded in January 1975 to U.S. Army soldiers stationed in mainland Europe. In April 1981, the deployment of the base version of the Dragon in the Army was complete. The Army initially deployed the Dragon as a squad weapon, with every rifle squad containing an antiarmor specialist who carried the weapon.

Reorganization in the 1990s saw Dragons moved, with mechanized infantry received two launchers per squad. Infantry, Airborne, and Air Assault units received a pair of two-man ATGM teams in the platoon's weapons squad, while Light Infantry (six teams) and Ranger (three teams) units held their Dragons at the company level.

In USMC service, the Dragon was concentrated at the battalion level in a dedicated missile platoon with 32 Dragon teams. The platoon was organized with four sections, each with four squads of two 2-man teams.

Guidance system
The M47 Dragon uses a so-called "automatic remote control" (TCA) guidance system previously used on the TOW and Shillelagh missiles.
With this system, all that is required of the infantryman is to look through an amplifying optical sight and keep it exactly aligned with the objective.

During this time, a second electro-optical system mounted parallel to the sight visually receives thermal radiation (generally infrared) from a pyrotechnic system located on the tail of the missile and focuses it on a sensitive receiver / locator. This continuously measures via a computer the position of the heat source (the missile) in relation to the line of sight fixed on the objective, any deviation automatically causing the desired correction signal, which is in turn transmitted along wires (connecting the missile to the launcher) and that without any intervention by the operator.

Variants

Dragon
The basic missile, the M222 missile, weighs 11.5 kilograms and is 744mm long in a 1154mm long launch tube. The fairly basic warhead can penetrate 330 mm of armor plate.

Dragon II
Dragon II is a simple warhead upgrade, originally called "Dragon PIP" and officially known as MK1 MOD0. The Dragon II received a new warhead that offers an 85% increase in penetration, to about 600mm. Weight increased to 12.3 kilograms and length to 846mm. Dragon II entered service in 1988.

Dragon III
A further improved Dragon II, the Dragon III received an even more powerful tandem shaped charge warhead, reportedly a Dragon II head with additional precursor charge. Exact penetration remains unknown, though it is claimed to be "several hundred millimeters" better than the SMAW's 600 mm pen HEAA rocket.

Additionally, the motor is improved, allowing the missile to reach a range of 1,000 meters in 6.5 seconds, much faster than the original missile's 11 second flight time. The improved motor increases the range as well, propelling Dragon III to 1,500 meters.

The second final improvement is a new combined day/night tracker with laser guidance. Only the United States Marine Corps bought this variant, beginning in 1991, while the Army opted to wait for Javelin to enter service.

Saeghe
Iran has reverse-engineered a version of the Dragon, the Saeghe. They displayed it in 2002 at the Defendory exhibition in Athens, when it was in mass production. Hezbollah has acquired Saeghes for anti-tank and anti-armor uses.

Known versions include Saeghe 1, a copy of Dragon II and Saeghe 2, a copy of Dragon III. Saeghe 3 is not confirmed to exist and Saeghe 4 is believed to use a thermobaric warhead. It is mostly produced for export, only issued to the Islamic Revolutionary Guard Corps (Iranian National Guard).

Saeghe (also transliterated as Saegheh, Saeqeh and several other variations) is a very common name for Iranian weapon systems. Other things with the name include a recon drone, a target drone, a fighter jet, an air-to-air missile, and an RPG-7 warhead.

Components
The launcher system of the M47 Dragon consists of a smoothbore fiberglass tube, breech/gas generator, tracker, bipod, battery, sling, and forward and aft shock absorbers. To fire the weapon, non-integrated day or night sights must be attached. While the launcher itself is expendable, the sights can be removed and reused.

SU-36/P Day Sight
The SU-36/P, properly "Infrared Tracker, Guided Missile, SU-36/P", provides the user with control over the missile. The sight slots onto the missile tube and  The SU-36/P has a 6x magnification capability and a viewing angle of 6°. The simple crosshair reticle has a pair of stadia lines  To the right of the gunner's monocular is an infrared receiver, consisting of a large lens fitted with a filter used to capture the infrared signal emitted by the missile during its flight.

Night Sight AN/TAS-5
The Dragon night tracker (AN/TAS-5) increases the gunner's ability to engage targets during limited visibility. Targets can be engaged during daylight and also during limited visibility such as smoke, fog, or darkness.

Operators

Current operators
 : Iranian Saeghe version

Former operators
 
 : Acquired M47 Dragons captured from Iran. Not operational and not in use.
 : Was replaced by the Spike in August 2001.
 : Phased out of service, being replaced by the Spike.
 
 : Since replaced by the FGM-148 Javelin.
: replaced by the FGM-148 Javelin

See also
 FGM-148 Javelin the successor to the FGM-77 Dragon
 BGM-71 TOW
 Shoulder-Launched Multipurpose Assault Weapon (SMAW)
 SRAW
 Eryx

References

External links

 McDonnell-Douglas FGM-77 Dragon – Designation Systems
 Comal citizen finds M47 Dragon missile launcher in the wood

Cold War missiles of the United States
Anti-tank guided missiles of the United States
Military equipment introduced in the 1970s